The A837 autoroute is a motorway in western France it is also known as the Autoroute des Oiseaux.

Junctions

Exchange A10-A837 Junction with A10 to Bordeaux to Paris.
Rest Area: La Pierre de Crazannes
Rest Area: Les Oiseaux
Péage de Cabariot
33 (Tonnay-Charente) Towns served: Tonnay
32 (Rochefort-nord) Towns served: Rochefort
31 (Rochefort centre) Towns served: Rochefort
Exchange A837-RD137 Autoroute becomes the RD137 to La Rochelle and Nantes.

European Routes 
All of the A837 is part of the E602 connecting La Rochelle to Saintes.

References

External links

 A837 Motorway on Saratlas

A837